The 2016–17 Brisbane Heat WBBL season was the second in the team's history. Captained by Delissa Kimmince until early January 2017 and by Kirby Short for the rest of the season, and coached by Andy Richards, the team competed in the WBBL02 competition.

At the conclusion of the group stage, the Heat was third on the table.  The Heat then lost to the Perth Scorchers in a semi-final to finish WBBL|02 in equal third place (with the Hobart Hurricanes).

Squad
The following is the Heat women squad for WBBL|02.  Players with international caps are listed in bold.

Sources

Ladder

Fixtures

Group stage

Knockout phase

Semi-final

References

2016–17 Women's Big Bash League season by team
Brisbane Heat (WBBL)